Yakima Valley may refer to:

Yakima River Valley in southeastern portion of the state of Washington
Yakima Valley AVA (viticultural area)
Yakima Valley Transportation Company a former bus and rail transportation company in the state of Washington